Urophora christophi is a species of tephritid or fruit flies in the genus Urophora of the family Tephritidae.

Distribution
South West Russia.

References

Urophora
Insects described in 1869
Diptera of Europe